The following is a partial list of keelboats and yacht types and sailing classes

Keelboats & yachts

See also
 Classic dinghy classes
 List of boat types
 List of historical ship types
 List of keelboat classes designed before 1970
 Olympic sailing classes
 Small-craft sailing

Notes

References

 Types

Boat types
Lists of watercraft types